The golden fruit dove (Ptilinopus luteovirens), also known as the lemon dove or yellow dove, is a small, approximately 20 cm (8 in) long, short-tailed fruit-dove in the family Columbidae. The common name refers to the males' bright golden-yellow colour. The body feathers appear almost iridescent due to their elongated shape and hair-like texture. The head is slightly duller with a greenish tinge. The bill, orbital skin and legs are bluish-green and the iris is whitish. The underwings and tail coverts are yellow. The female is a dark green bird with bare parts resembling those of the male. The young resembles the female.

The golden fruit dove is endemic to the forests of Fiji. The diet consists mainly of various small fruits, berries and insects. The female usually lays a single white egg.

The golden fruit dove is closely related to the whistling fruit dove and orange fruit dove. These species are allopatric, meaning they do not share the same habitat in any location.

A common species throughout its limited range, the golden fruit dove is evaluated as Least Concern on the IUCN Red List of Threatened Species.

Taxonomy and systematics 
The golden fruit dove is one of over 50 species in the genus Ptilinopus. Within the genus, it is most closely related to the orange fruit dove and whistling fruit dove. These three species are placed together in their own subgenus, Chrysoena. They are also sometimes treated as their own genus. It is monotypic.

The species' generic name comes from the Ancient Greek ptilon (feather) and pous (foot), while the specific epithet luteovirens is from the Latin luteus (orange-yellow), and virens (green), referring to its colour.

Distribution and habitat 
The golden dove is endemic to the islands of Viti Levu, Ovalau, Beqa, Ngau and Waya. It mainly inhabits open forest, gallery forest, and secondary growth, but is also found in mature rainforest with sparse undergrowth and tall trees. They are occasionally found near towns and villages.

References

Cited text

External links 
 BirdLife Species Factsheet
 Photo of a male Golden Dove by Bill Beckon International Dove Society.

golden fruit dove
Endemic birds of Fiji
golden fruit dove
Taxa named by Jacques Bernard Hombron
Taxa named by Honoré Jacquinot
Taxobox binomials not recognized by IUCN